Mark Murphy Sings is a 1975 studio album by Mark Murphy.

Reception

The Allmusic review by Scott Yanow said that "This CD reissue brings back one of singer Mark Murphy's best all-round sessions...Murphy is heard throughout in prime form, constantly stretching himself"

Track listing
 "On the Red Clay" (Freddie Hubbard, Murphy) - 4:35
 "Naima" (John Coltrane) - 4:49
 "Body and Soul" (Frank Eyton, Johnny Green, Edward Heyman, Robert Sour) - 5:15
 "Young and Foolish" (Albert Hague, Arnold B. Horwitt) - 2:49
 "Empty Faces" (Lani Hall, Milton Nascimento) - 5:15
 "Maiden Voyage" (Herbie Hancock) - 5:26
 "How Are You Dreaming?" (Bob Crewe, A. Shatkin) - 4:29
 "Cantaloupe Island" (Hancock, Murphy) - 5:35

Personnel
Performance
Mark Murphy - vocals
David Matthews - arranger
Harvie S - double bass
Jimmy Madison - drums
Don Grolnick - fender rhodes, keyboards, organ, piano
Joe Puma - guitar
Sue Evans - percussion
David Sanborn - alto saxophone
Michael Brecker - tenor saxophone
Randy Brecker - trumpet
Production
Hal Wilson - art direction, illustrations
Wieslaw Woszczyk - engineer, remixing
Michael Bourne - liner notes
Dave Helland
Helen Keane - producer

References

Muse Records albums
Mark Murphy (singer) albums
1975 albums